Porat is a Jewish surname. Notable people with the surname include:

Ariel Porat (born 1956), Israeli jurist and academic
Carl Oscar von Porat (1843–1927), Swedish naturalist
Dina Porat (born 1943), Israeli historian
Elisha Porat (1938–2013), Israeli poet and writer
Hanan Porat (1943–2011), Israeli rabbi, educator and politician 
Iddo Porat, Israeli legal scholar
Marc Porat, American tech entrepreneur and angel investor
Matan Porat, Israeli pianist and composer
Orna Porat (1924–2015), German-born Israeli theater actress
Ruth Porat (born 1957), British-born American financial executive
Yosef Porat (1909–1996), German-Israeli chess player

See also
Porat
Ben-Porat